Meat Puppets II is the second album by the Phoenix, Arizona band the Meat Puppets, released in 1984. It is a departure from their self-titled debut album, which consisted largely of noisy hardcore with unintelligible vocals. It covers many genres from country-style rock ("Magic Toy Missing", "Climbing" and Lost") to slow acoustic songs ("Plateau" and "Oh, Me") to psychedelic guitar effects ("Aurora Borealis" and "We’re Here").

The cover art is by Curt Kirkwood and Neal Holliday.

Rykodisc reissued the album in 1999 with extra tracks and B-sides, including a cover of the Rolling Stones' Aftermath-era track "What To Do."

The Meat Puppets' SST labelmates Minutemen covered "Lost" on the live EP Tour-Spiel and their last studio album, 3-Way Tie (For Last). Three of the album's songs were covered by Nirvana (as the Kirkwood brothers joined them onstage) during their "Unplugged" show for MTV ("Plateau", "Oh, Me", and "Lake of Fire").

Reception

Kurt Loder in an April 1984 review in Rolling Stone described Meat Puppets II as "one of the funniest and most enjoyable albums" of the year, feeling that the band had developed beyond thrash music to become "a kind of cultural trash compacter" in which they blend head-banging with "a bit of the Byrds...Hendrix-style guitar...and...Blonde on Blonde-style wordsmithing". In his review for The Village Voice, Robert Christgau felt that Curt Kirkwood had combined "the amateur and the avant-garde with a homely appeal", which resulted in a "calmly demented country music" in a "psychedelic" vein.

Robert Hilburn commented in the Los Angeles Times that they were "far more of an acquired promising though willfully unfocused rock act".

Legacy
The album was included in the book 1001 Albums You Must Hear Before You Die and was also #94 on Pitchfork Media's "Best Albums of the 1980s".  Slant Magazine listed the album at #91 on its list of "Best Albums of the 1980s".

The final track "The Whistling Song" was taken as the title of Stephen Beachy's first novel.  Curt Kirkwood created the cover art for the book.

The album was performed live in its entirety at the All Tomorrow's Parties festival in Monticello, New York in 2008 as part of the ATP Don't Look Back season, and again in December, 2008 at a performance in London.

Track listing

Personnel
Meat Puppets
 Curt Kirkwood – guitar, vocals
 Cris Kirkwood – bass, vocals
 Derrick Bostrom – drums
Technical
Spot - engineer
Curt Kirkwood, Neal Holliday - cover artwork

References

External links

Meat Puppets II (Adobe Flash) at Radio3Net (streamed copy where licensed)

Meat Puppets albums
1983 albums
SST Records albums